The theory of sonics is a branch of continuum mechanics which describes the transmission of mechanical energy through vibrations. The birth of the theory of sonics is the publication of the book A treatise on transmission of power by vibrations in 1918 by the Romanian scientist Gogu Constantinescu.
ONE of the fundamental problems of mechanical engineering is that of transmitting energy found in nature, after suitable transformation, to some point at which can be made available for performing useful work. The methods of transmitting power known and practised by engineers are broadly included in two classes: mechanical including hydraulic, pneumatic and wire rope methods; and electrical methods....According to the new system, energy is transmitted from one point to another, which may be at a considerable distance, by means of impressed variations of pressure or tension producing longitudinal vibrations in solid, liquid or gaseous columns. The energy is transmitted by periodic changes of pressure and volume in the longitudinal direction and may be described as wave transmission of power, or mechanical wave transmission. – Gogu Constantinescu

Later on the theory was expanded in electro-sonic, hydro-sonic, sonostereo-sonic and thermo-sonic.
The theory was the first chapter of compressible flow applications and has stated for the first time the mathematical theory of compressible fluid, and was considered a branch of continuum mechanics. The laws discovered by Constantinescu, used in sonicity are the same with the laws used in electricity.

Book chapters
The book A treatise on transmission of power by vibrations has the following chapters:

 Introductory
 Elementary physical principles
 Definitions
 Effects of capacity, inertia, friction, and leakage on alternating currents
 Waves in long pipes
 Alternating in long pipes allowing for Friction
 Theory of displacements – motors
 Theory of resonators
 High-frequency currents
 Charged lines
 Transformers

George Constantinescu defined his work as follow.

Theory of sonics: applications 

 The Constantinesco synchronization gear, used on military aircraft in order to allow them to target opponents without damaging their own propellers.
 Automatic gear
 Sonic Drilling, was one of the first applications developed by Constantinescu. A sonic drill head works by sending high frequency resonant vibrations down the drill string to the drill bit, while the operator controls these frequencies to suit the specific conditions of the soil/rock geology.
 Torque Converter. A mechanical application of sonic theory on the transmission of power by vibrations. Power is transmitted from the engine to the output shaft through a system of oscillating levers and inertias.
 Sonic Engine

Elementary physical principles

If v is the velocity of which waves travel along the pipe, and n the number of the revolutions of the crank a, then the wavelength λ is:

Assuming that the pipe is finite and closed at the point r situated at a distance which is multiple of λ, and considering that the piston is smaller than wavelength, at r the wave compression is stopped and reflected, the reflected wave traveling back along the pipe.

Definitions

Alternating fluid currents 

Considering any flow or pipes, if:

 ω = the area section of the pipe measured in square centimeters;
 v = the velocity of the fluid at any moment in centimeters per second;

and

i = the flow of liquid in cubic centimeters per second,

then we have:

i = vω

Assuming that the fluid current is produced by a piston having a simple harmonic movement, in a piston cylinder having a section of Ω square centimeters.
If we have:

r = the equivalent of driving crank in centimeters
 a = the angular velocity of the crank or the pulsations in radians per second.
 n = the number of crank rotations per second.

Then:

 The flow from the cylinder to the pipe is: i = I sin(at+φ)

Where:

I = raΩ (the maximum alternating flow in square centimeters per second; the amplitude of the flow.)
 t = time in seconds
 φ = the angle of the phase

If T= period of a complete alternation (one revolution of the crank) then:

 a = 2πn; where n = 1/T

The effective current can be defined by the equation:
 and the effective velocity is : 
The stroke volume δ will be given by the relation:

Alternating pressures
The alternating pressures are very similar to alternating currents in electricity.
In a pipe where the currents are flowing, we will have:
; where H is the maximum alternating pressure measured in kilograms per square centimeter.  the angle of phase;  representing the mean pressure in the pipe.
Considering the above formulas:
If p1 is the pressure at an arbitrary point and p2 pressure in another arbitrary point:
The difference  is defined as instantaneous hydromotive force between point p1 and p2, H representing the amplitude.
The effective hydromotive force will be:

Friction 

In alternating current flowing through a pipe, there is friction at the surface of the pipe and also in the liquid itself. Therefore, the relation between the hydromotive force and current can be written as:

; where R = coefficient of friction in 

Using experiments R may be calculated from formula:

 ;

Where:

  is the density of the liquid in kg per cm.3
 l is the length of the pipe in cm.
 g is the gravitational acceleration in cm. per sec.2
  is the section of the pipe in square centimeters.
 veff is the effective velocity
 d is the internal diameter of the pipe in centimeters.
 for water (an approximation from experimental data).
 h is the instantaneous hydromotive force
If we introduce  in the formula, we get:

 which is equivalent to:
 ; introducing k in the formula results in 
For pipes with a greater diameter, a greater velocity can be achieved for same value of k.
The loss of power due to friction is calculated by:
, putting h = Ri results in:

Therefore:

Capacity and condensers
Definition: Hydraulic condensers are appliances for making alterations in value of fluid currents, pressures or phases of alternating fluid currents. The apparatus usually consists of a mobile solid body, which divides the liquid column, and is fixed elastically in a middle position such that it follows the movements of the liquid column.

The principal function of hydraulic condensers is to counteract inertia effects due to moving masses.

Notes

References
https://archive.org/stream/theoryofwavetran00consrich#page/n3/mode/2up
http://www.rexresearch.com/constran/1constran.htm
Constantinesco, G. Theory of Sonics: A Treatise on Transmission of Power by Vibrations. The Admiralty, London, 1918.
Constantinesco, G., Sonics. Trans. Soc. of Engineers, London, June 1959
Clark, R.Edison, The Man Who Made the Future. Macdonald and Jane's, London, 1977.
McNeil, I., George Constantinesco, 1881–1965 and the Development of Sonic Power Transmission. Excerpt from volume 54, Trans. of the Newcomen Society, London, 1982–83.
Constantinesco, G., A Hundred Years of Development in Mechanical Engineering. Trans. Soc. of Engineers, London, Sept. 1954.
http://www.gs-harper.com/Mining_Research/Power/Sonics005.asp
Constantinesco, G. Transmission of Power the Present, the Future. Paper read before the North East Coast Institution of Engineers and Shipbuilders in Newcastle upon Tyne, on 4 December 1925. Reprinted by order of the Council. North East Coast Institution of Engineers and Shipbuilders, Newcastle upon Tyne, 1926.
https://web.archive.org/web/20090603102058/http://www.rri.ro/arh-art.shtml?lang=1&sec=9&art=3596
http://www.utcluj.ro/download/doctorat/Rezumat_Carmen_Bal.pdf
http://www.rexresearch.com/constran/1constran.htm
http://imtuoradea.ro/auo.fmte/files-2008/MECANICA_files/MARCU%20FLORIN%201.pdf
http://dynamicsflorio.webs.com/arotmm.htm

George Constantinescu
Mathematical physics
Romanian inventions